Io, IO, iO, I/O, i/o, or i.o. may refer to:

 Io (mythology), daughter of Inachus in Greek mythology, and lover of Zeus who was turned into a cow
 Io (moon), a moon of Jupiter

Arts and media

Fictional elements
Scylla Io, one of Poseidon's Marine Generals in the Saint Seiya series
A Dungeons & Dragons dragon deity
Io Otonashi, a main character in the Japanese manga series Place to Place (Acchi Kocchi)

Gaming
iO, a 2014 video game by Gamious
IO Interactive, a Danish computer game developer

Music
IO (German band), a German band
Io (English band), an English band
I_o (musician), an American DJ and record producer (1990–2020)

Theatre and opera
Io (opera), an unfinished acte de ballet (opera) by Jean-Philippe Rameau
iO Theater (ImprovOlympic), a theater in Chicago, Illinois, dedicated to improvisational comedy
IO West, a Los Angeles theater associated with the Chicago iO

Other uses in arts and media
EO (original Polish title: IO), a 2022 Jerzy Skolimowski film
Io, a 2019 Netflix film
iO Digital Cable Service, a service offered by Cablevision
International Organization, a peer-reviewed journal that covers the entire field of international affairs

Business and economics
Industrial and organizational psychology, the field of psychology that studies work, academic, and other organizational issues
Industrial organization, the field of economics that studies the strategic behavior of firms, the structure of markets and their interactions
Insertion order, a business document specifying the inventory goal of an advertising campaign
Integrated operations, a term used in the petroleum industry describing new work processes and ways of working that have been facilitated by modern information and communication technologies
Interest-only, a type of collateralized mortgage obligation (CMO) or mortgage-backed security

Language
i.o., Latin phrase meaning "respectively" ("in that order")
Io (princely title), a particle of a title used by Moldavian and Wallachian Princes-regnant
Ido language (ISO 639-1 language code IO), a constructed language
Indirect object, the object that is the recipient of an action (by a verb)

Mythology
Io (mythology), daughter of Inachus in Greek mythology, and lover of Zeus who was turned into a cow
Io, an alternate spelling of the nereid Ino, later known as Leukothea, who in the Odyssey gave Odysseus a veil that allowed him to breathe underwater
Io Matua Kore, in some Māori traditions the supreme god

People
, Japanese shogi player
, Japanese manga artist 
Io Shirai (born 1990), Japanese professional wrestler
, Japanese manga artist
iO Tillett Wright (born 1985), American artist, director, photographer, writer, film maker, activist, and actor

Places on Earth
Io (island), an uninhabited islet near Crete, Greece
Io, Norway, a village in Alver, Norway
Mount Iō (disambiguation), name of several mountains in Japan
Indian Ocean

Science and technology

Astronomy
Io (moon), a moon of Jupiter
85 Io, an asteroid

Biology and medicine
Io (gastropod), a genus of freshwater snail in the family Pleuroceridae
Io (plant), a genus of plant in the tribe Senecioneae
Automeris io, a moth species in North America
Aglais io, the European peacock butterfly
Intraosseous infusion, the medical process of introducing medication directly into the bone marrow
Hawaiian hawk, in the local dialect
Immuno-oncology, another term for cancer immunotherapy

Computing
.io, the Internet country code top-level domain (ccTLD) for the British Indian Ocean Territory
Io (programming language), a pure object-oriented programming language
IO.SYS, a system file in Microsoft DOS and Windows 95, 98 and ME
Indistinguishability obfuscation, a cryptographic tool to obscure computer code
Input/output, the collection of interfaces that different functional units of an information processing system use to communicate with each other

Other uses in science and technology
Ionium (symbol Io), a claimed chemical element that was later realized to be thorium-230
Image orthicon tube, a TV camera used between 1946 and 1968
Infinitely often, a mathematics term sometimes written "i.o."; see an example in set-theoretic limit

Other uses
Bureau of International Organization Affairs, in the U.S. Department of State
Government Printing Bureau (Macau), known in Portuguese as the Imprensa Oficial or "IO"
Indonesian Airlines (IATA airline designator IO)
Investigating Officer, a member of law enforcement in the United Kingdom who heads an investigation
Mitsubishi Pajero iO, a mini SUV model produced by Mitsubishi Motors

See also
Ю or yu, a Cyrillic letter
I/O (disambiguation)
IOS (disambiguation)
I0 (disambiguation) (the letter "I" followed by the digit "0")
10 (disambiguation) (the digit "1" followed by the digit "0")
1O (disambiguation) (the digit "1" followed by the letter "O")

Japanese feminine given names